Griff & Lock is an album by saxophonists Eddie "Lockjaw" Davis and Johnny Griffin recorded in 1960 and released on the Jazzland label.

Reception 

The contemporaneous DownBeat reviewer described the album as "hearty, full-blowing jazz of the type now associated with this partnership of contrasting tenor styles". The AllMusic review by Scott Yanow stated: "Easily recommended to straightahead jazz fans."

Track listing 
 "The Last Train from Overbrook" (James Moody) - 6:50   
 "Hey Lock!" (Eddie "Lockjaw" Davis) - 7:54   
 "Midnight at Minton's" (Babs Gonzales) - 5:23
 "Second Balcony Jump" (Billy Eckstine, Jerry Valentine) - 4:19   
 "I'll Remember April" (Gene de Paul, Patricia Johnston, Don Raye) - 6:33   
 "Good Bait" (Tadd Dameron) - 7:39

Personnel 
 Eddie "Lockjaw" Davis, Johnny Griffin - tenor saxophone
 Junior Mance - piano
 Larry Gales - bass
 Ben Riley - drums

References 

1961 albums
Eddie "Lockjaw" Davis albums
Johnny Griffin albums
Albums produced by Orrin Keepnews
Jazzland Records (1960) albums